Viking (South) Aerodrome  is located  southwest of Viking, Alberta, Canada.

See also
Viking Airport

References

External links
Page about this airport on COPA's Places to Fly airport directory

Registered aerodromes in Alberta
Beaver County, Alberta